183rd Paratroopers Division "Ciclone" was a short-lived airborne division of the Royal Italian Army during World War II. The Ciclone began to form in summer 1943 at the Parachute School in Viterbo and by the end of summer four battalions had been trained.

After the Armistice between Italy and Allied armed forces was announced on 8 September 1943 the XX Paratroopers Battalion was dispatched to occupy the Cisa and Futa passes in the Apennine Mountains between Bologna and Florence. Reinforced by elements of the XIX Paratroopers Battalion the paratroopers engaged in light skirmishes with Wehrmacht forces for three days before surrendering. After the surrender more than half of the division's troops decided to join the fascist Aeronautica Nazionale Repubblicana's paratrooper units.

Organization 
 183rd Paratroopers Division "Ciclone"
 Command Company
 XVII Paratroopers Battalion
 XVIII Paratroopers Battalion
 XIX Paratroopers Battalion
 XX Paratroopers Battalion
 I Paratroopers Artillery Group

Commanding officers 
The division's commanding officer was:

 Generale di Brigata Giorgio Morigi

See also 
 Paracadutisti
 Paratroopers Brigade "Folgore" present day Italian Airborne Brigade

References

Notes

External links 

Airborne divisions of Italy
Divisions of Italy in World War II